Nos Braços do Pai is the fifth album in the live praise and worship series of contemporary worship music by Diante do Trono.

About the project 

In the pre-recording of the Nos Braços do Pai, the mining group released the Preciso de Ti album, recorded at the Mineirão Stadium, in Belo Horizonte.

In July 2002, the Ministries Esplanade in Brasilia, one of the biggest stages ever built in Brazil was erected 78 meters ahead. The event was a record crowd in the national capital: 1,200,000 people. Nos Braços do Pai coincided with Brazil's victory in the World Cup and brasiliense people can contemplate yellow green special lighting placed in the domes of the Senate and Congress especially for the production. People all over the country organized themselves and mobilized caravans to be present in most Christian event ever held in the country's political capital. The CD is part of the development of Brasil Diante do Trono campaign, the first stage was chosen Rio de Janeiro, in Maracanã Stadium.

Talent Trophy in 2003, Nos Braços do Pai won the award for Best CD Praise and Worship, and Ministry was recognized again as Group of the Year.

The album Nos Braços do Pai, was also recorded in English (In the Father's Arms) and Spanish (En los Brazos del Padre), in 2006.

Track listings

CD

DVD

References

2002 live albums
2002 video albums
Live video albums
Diante do Trono video albums
Diante do Trono live albums
Portuguese-language live albums